This is a list of seasons completed by the Cardiff Devils ice hockey team, presently of the British Elite League. This list documents the season-by-season records of the Cardiff Devils from their foundation in 1986 to the present day. Beginning in Division Two Midlands, the Devils rose quickly through the ranks of British ice hockey, winning the league title and British Championship in only their fourth season of existence. Since then the club has won a further three league titles and three playoff championships as well as one Autumn Cup and one Challenge Cup.

Since winning promotion to the Premier League in 1989, Cardiff have played all but two seasons at British ice hockey's highest level. Of the ten current members of the Elite League, only the Nottingham Panthers have played more seasons in top flight ice hockey.

Footnotes

References
 
 An ongoing history of the Nottingham Panthers by Peter Walch
 The Internet Hockey Database
 Hockey Results & Tables – Malcolm Preen

Ice hockey in Wales
Sport in Cardiff